The Brazilian Internet Steering Committee (CGI.br) is a Brazilian government agency, first proposed in May 1995 by the then Ministry of Communication and the Ministry of Science and Technology (currently Ministry of Science, Technology, Innovation and Communication), and officially created on 3 September 2003. It is a multi-stakeholder organization with members from the government, the corporate sector, the third sector and the academic community.

The purpose of the agency is to promote technical quality, innovation and the dissemination of Internet services in Brazil.

See also
Brazilian Civil Rights Framework for the Internet
NIC.br
Registro.br and .br
IX.br, the Brazilian internet exchange point system operated by CGI.br

References

External links
 (in Portuguese)
 (in English)

Internet in Brazil
Government agencies of Brazil